A McWhirtle is a light verse form similar to a double dactyl, invented in 1989 by American poet Bruce Newling. McWhirtles share essentially the same form as double dactyls, but without the strict requirements, making them easier to write. Specifically:

 McWhirtles do not require a nonsense phrase (e.g., "Higgledy piggledy") on the first line.
 There is no requirement for a double-dactylic word in the second stanza.
 There is an extra unstressed syllable added to the beginning of the first line of each stanza.
 Although the meter is the same as in a double-dactyl, syllables may move from the end of one line to the beginning of the next for readability. This plus the extra unstressed syllable makes McWhirtles essentially an informal double amphibrach.

The looser form allows poets additional freedom to include additional rhymes and other stylistic devices.

The form is named after the fictional protagonist in an early example by Newling, included with his original written description of the form, dated August 12, 1989; but his first McWhirtle, in which his friend "Skip" Ungar is the protagonist and which also appeared with his original description, was:

The Piano Player

I read in the papers
That Harry F. Ungar
Performs in a night spot
Near soigne Scotch Plains,

Caressing the keyboard
While affluent yuppies
Are eating and drinking
Their capital gains.

The first published description of the McWhirtle, with examples, was in E.O. Parrott, ed., How to Be Well-Versed in Poetry, London: Viking, 1990, pp. 197–200; and the verse form was also described in Anne H. Soukhanov, Word Watch - The Stories Behind the Words of Our Lives, New York: Henry Holt and Company, 1995, pp. 388–89.

An example by American poet Kenn Nesbitt:

Fernando the Fearless

We're truly in awe of
Fernando the Fearless
who needed no net
for the flying trapeze.

Alas, what a shame
it's surprisingly difficult
catching a bar
in the midst of a sneeze.

Genres of poetry
Poetic rhythm
Stanzaic form
1989 introductions